The 1996 Austrian motorcycle Grand Prix was the tenth round of the 1996 Grand Prix motorcycle racing season. It took place on 4 August 1996 at the A1-Ring.

500 cc classification

250cc classification

125cc classification

References

Austrian motorcycle Grand Prix
Austrian
Motorcycle Grand Prix